Anton Kostadinov Velkov (born 15 July 1968) is a Bulgarian former football player and currently football manager of Lokomotiv 1929 Sofia.

Career
Born in Sofia, Velkov played in his career for Lokomotiv Sofia, USA football club Virginia Beach Mariners and German SC Paderborn 07.

Coaching career
Velkov started his coaching career in 2007 as assistant manager to Stefan Grozdanov in Lokomotiv Sofia.

References

Living people
1968 births
Bulgarian footballers
Bulgarian football managers
Bulgaria youth international footballers
Bulgaria under-21 international footballers
Bulgarian expatriate footballers
FC Lokomotiv 1929 Sofia players
SC Paderborn 07 players
First Professional Football League (Bulgaria) players
Expatriate footballers in Germany
PSFC Chernomorets Burgas managers
FC Lokomotiv 1929 Sofia managers
Association football defenders